The 2017 Buckle Up in Your Truck 225 was the tenth stock car race of the 2017 NASCAR Camping World Truck Series and the seventh iteration of the event. The race was held throughout the days of July 6–7, 2017 due to rain delaying the race. The race was held in Sparta, Kentucky, at Kentucky Speedway, a 1.5-mile (2.41 km) tri-oval speedway. The race took the scheduled 150 laps to complete. At race's end, Christopher Bell, driving for Kyle Busch Motorsports, would comeback from an early spin and fiercely defend the lead in the late stages of the race to win his fifth NASCAR Camping World Truck Series win and his third of the season. To fill out the podium, Brandon Jones of MDM Motorsports and Justin Haley of GMS Racing would finish second and third, respectively.

Background 

Kentucky Speedway is a 1.5-mile (2.4 km) tri-oval speedway in Sparta, Kentucky, which has hosted ARCA, NASCAR and Indy Racing League racing annually since it opened in 2000. The track is currently owned and operated by Speedway Motorsports, Inc. and Jerry Carroll, who, along with four other investors, owned Kentucky Speedway until 2008. The speedway has a grandstand capacity of 117,000. Construction of the speedway began in 1998 and was completed in mid-2000. The speedway has hosted the Gander RV & Outdoors Truck Series, Xfinity Series, IndyCar Series, Indy Lights, and most recently, the NASCAR Cup Series beginning in 2011.

Entry list 

 (R) denotes rookie driver.
 (i) denotes driver who is ineligible for series driver points.

*Withdrew due to the #0 entry not having a good chance of qualifying if qualifying was rained out.

Practice

First practice 
The first practice session was held on Wednesday, July 3, at 3:00 PM EST, and would last for an hour and 25 minutes.

Second and final practice 
The second and final practice session, sometimes referred to as Happy Hour, was held on Wednesday, July 3, at 5:00 PM EST, and would last for an hour and 25 minutes.

Qualifying 
Qualifying was scheduled to be held on Thursday, July 6, at 5:00 PM EST. However, qualifying was canceled due to inclement weather. As a result, the starting lineup was determined by the rulebook. As a result, GMS Racing driver Johnny Sauter would earn the pole.

Joe Nemechek was the only driver to fail to qualify.

Full starting lineup

Race results 
Stage 1 Laps: 35

Stage 2 Laps: 35

Stage 3 Laps: 80

Standings after the race 

Drivers' Championship standings

Note: Only the first 8 positions are included for the driver standings.

References 

2017 NASCAR Camping World Truck Series
NASCAR races at Kentucky Speedway
July 2017 sports events in the United States
2017 in sports in Kentucky